A rubber glove is a glove made out of natural rubber or Synthetic rubber. The term ‘rubber’ refers to durable, waterproof and elastic material made from natural or synthetic latex. Rubber gloves can be unsupported (rubber only) or supported (rubber coating of textile glove). Its primary purpose is protection of the  hands while performing tasks involving chemicals. Rubber gloves can be worn during dishwashing to protect the hands from detergent and allow the use of hotter water. Sometimes caregivers will use rubber gloves during the diaper changing process to prevent contact with the child's fecal material/urine. Health professionals use medical gloves rather than rubber gloves when performing surgical operations.

Origin
In 1894, William Stewart Halsted, the first chief of surgery at Johns Hopkins Hospital, invented rubber gloves for his wife Caroline Hampton as he noticed her hands were affected on the daily surgeries she had performed and in order to prevent medical staff from developing dermatitis from surgical chemicals. However, the first modern disposable glove was invented by Ansell Rubber Co. Pty. Ltd. in 1965.

Household use 

Household rubber gloves have been used for washing dishes and cleaning in the home since the 1960s. Many different designs of gloves have been available in a multitude of colors but traditional designs are yellow or pink with long cuffs.  While these still remain the most popular patterns today, gloves can be obtained that range from wrist-length to those that are shoulder-length.  There are even gloves that are pre-attached to shirts and bodysuits for added protection.

Rubber gloves are best worn with a skin tight fit which, while still allowing for the hands to breathe, makes it easier to hold objects and manipulate them. The palms and fingers usually have a raised pattern which helps provide a good grip when handling objects. Wearing gloves protects the hands from harsh detergents and other cleaning products which are used in the home and elsewhere.

These gloves are traditionally used by people cleaning in the home and are popular with professional cleaners and for clearing up in shops, cafes and other public places. The thickness of the gloves and the long cuffs provide excellent protection for all general cleaning tasks and are useful for all chores where the hands need to be put into water, and provide protection when vacuuming, dusting, and polishing.

The most common material used for making household gloves is latex, a form of rubber. Usually, the gloves have a cotton "flock" lining for easily taking them on and off. They are available in a wider range of colors and cuff lengths.  Problems with latex rubber include allergic reactions and poor protection against such substances as solvents.  Other materials used to alleviate this are PVC, nitrile, and neoprene.  Natural rubber that has been chemically treated to reduce the amount of antibody generators, such as Vytex Natural Rubber Latex, can be used to produce a glove that retains the properties of traditional rubber while exposing the user to significantly reduced amounts of latex allergens.

Gloves are used in the Foodservice Industry for minimizing contact with ready to eat foods.  Generally, foodservice employees are required to wash hands before starting work or putting on single-use gloves.  Due to the incidence of latex allergies, many people switch to vinyl or nitrile gloves. Poly gloves are a very inexpensive alternative. Latex, Vinyl and Nitrile gloves are available in powder and powder-free varieties. The powder in the gloves are made of USDA cornstarch. Powder-free gloves are generally more expensive than powdered gloves because gloves must be powdered to be removed from the mold they are made on. The majority of disposable gloves are manufactured in China, Malaysia, Indonesia and Vietnam.

Disposable gloves are sometimes used in childcare during the diapering/ toileting process to protect the caregiver from coming in contact with the child's fecal material/urine. Fecal matter in particular as it is known to carry many diseases. Many caregivers use gloves while touching the child's buttocks or genitals when wiping or applying creams. These gloves are made of latex, vinyl or nitrile.

Use to hide fingerprints
Criminals sometimes wear gloves while committing crimes in order to avoid leaving fingerprints, which can be used as evidence against them. When thin gloves are used, however, fingerprints may actually pass through as glove prints, thus transferring the wearers' prints onto surfaces. Fingerprints are also left on the glove itself, and it is possible to develop latent fingerprints from gloves left at or near the scene of a crime.  The sex of the person wearing the glove can be accurately determined from a glove print.

Limitations
Karen Wetterhahn was killed by mercury poisoning after a few drops of dimethylmercury landed on her glove during an experiment.  Tests later showed that dimethylmercury, a small apolar molecule, can rapidly permeate different kinds of latex gloves and enter the skin within about 15 seconds.  Wetterhahn's death led to much greater awareness of the problems of glove porosity in chemical safety, leading to mandates for the use of plastic-laminate gloves (SilverShield) for handling dimethylmercury and produced a lasting and significant improvement in laboratory safety.

See also
Glove
Medical glove
Finger cot
Latex allergy

References

Safety clothing
Gloves